Kanawyers (formerly, Kanawyer) is an unincorporated community in Fresno County, California. It lies at an elevation of 5020 feet (1530 m) in the canyon of the South Fork of the Kings River at the end of State Route 180.

The Kanawyer post office operated from 1908 to 1914. The town was founded by Peter Napoleon Kanawyer, who mined copper from the nearby creek which now bears the metal's name.

This area is also known now as Cedar Grove (Roads End) in Kings Canyon National Park.

References

Unincorporated communities in California
Unincorporated communities in Fresno County, California
Populated places established in 1908
1908 establishments in California